The Sphinx was an experimental Soviet project for a home automation system, commissioned by the State Committee for Science and Technology and designed by Dmitry Azrikan, in collaboration with A. Kolotushkin and V. Goessen, in 1987. Sphinx, an acronym for Super Functional Integrated Communication System, was intended to be an ensemble of modules that would allow consumers to easily interact with information systems.

The home environment, as described in a 1987 issue of Soviet magazine Technical Aesthetics, would be composed of "spherical speakers, a detachable monitor, headphones, a handheld remote control with a removable display, a diskette drive, a processor with three memory blocks and more". The modules were designed to be used collectively, or individually by family members, and the number of memory blocks was supposed to be possibly increased endlessly according to the needs of the household so different family members could activate different programs simultaneously.

According to Sergey Moiseyev, Head the VNIITE (Russian design research institute):

The configuration of the Sphinx station, with detachable monitors and speakers, prefigured the environment of computer stations with peripheral touch pads and accessories that characterises informatics systems in the beginnings of the 21st century.

References 

Science and technology in the Soviet Union
History of computing
Product design